A composition doll is a doll made partially or wholly out of composition, a composite material composed of sawdust, glue, and other materials such as cornstarch, resin and wood flour. The first composition dolls were made in the 19th century. 

Composite dolls were marketed as unbreakable, compared to earlier more fragile dolls. However, over time the composite material deteriorated, leaving many older dolls with small cracks and flaked surfaces. Some dolls were given a protective coating of varnish to delay deterioration.

Background
Many antique German and French bisque dolls from the 19th century combine a bisque head with a ball-jointed body made of composition. In 1877 French dollmaker Jumeau introduced the Bébé Incassable, with a bisque head portraying a young girl and a fully articulated composition body. With realistic glass eyes and contemporary fashion styles, thousands of Bébé dolls were produced for an international market. The French Bleuette doll from S.F.B.J. has a jointed composition body with a bisque or composition head. The composition Bleuette was produced from 1905 to 1958.

In the United States composition dolls were hailed as an improvement in doll making from the fragile bisque and china material previously used. Two types of composition manufacturing processes were used: cold press and hot press. The cold-press composition manufacturing process was invented by Solomon D. Hoffmann  in the 1890s. Hot-press composition began around 1920 and was an improvement in the processing. Horsman secured the rights from Hoffmann, whose company was the American Doll Company.

Some early celebrity dolls were made of composition, like the Baby Peggy doll from Louis Amberg & Sons, which was a success in 1923. The American Ideal Toy Company began making composition dolls in 1907. They produced over 200 variations of dolls throughout the composition era. Their Shirley Temple doll was one of the most successful celebrity dolls. First produced in 1934, millions of the composition Shirley dolls were produced. Composition doll manufacturing lasted until the late 1940s in the U.S., when plastic began to be used for dolls.

References

19th-century toys
Dolls